Clemelis is a genus of flies in the family Tachinidae.

Species
C. apicalis (Villeneuve, 1923)
C. gymnops Herting, 1975
C. majuscula Mesnil, 1954
C. massilia Herting, 1977
C. pullata (Meigen, 1824)

References

Tachinidae genera
Exoristinae
Taxa named by Jean-Baptiste Robineau-Desvoidy